Beesons is an unincorporated community in Washington Township, Wayne County, in the U.S. state of Indiana.

History
A post office was established at Beesons in 1865, and remained in operation until it was discontinued in 1890.

Geography

References

Unincorporated communities in Wayne County, Indiana
Unincorporated communities in Indiana